Equity Index (EQI) is a way the Ministry of Education uses to calculate equity funding for schools in New Zealand. It replaces the current socioeconomic decile system, which will be phased out from January 2023.

Background 
In September 2019 the Sixth Labour Government announced the decile system would be replaced by a new "Equity Index" which would come into effect as early as 2021.

In mid-May 2022, the 2022 New Zealand budget allocated $8 million for the capital cost and $293 million for operating costs for the new Equity Index, but no date of introduction was given.

Implementation 
In July 2022, their Equity Index rating numbers were advised to New Zealand (public) schools to be introduced next year, with the amount of equity funding for each school to be announced in September 2022. The Statistics Department utilised 37 socio-economic factors for each pupil, including both parents’ educational levels, imprisonment data and benefit history plus Oranga Tamariki notifications and student transience to calculate a school index number between 344 and 569 for each school, with a national average of 463 and a higher index number meaning more EQI index funding. The New Zealand educational system was claimed to be “one of the world’s least equal education systems" (actually 33 out of 38 in the OECD).

See also 

 Child poverty in New Zealand
 Social class in New Zealand
 Socioeconomic decile

References 

Education in New Zealand
Socio-economic statistics